The Piast coal mine is a large mine in the south of Poland in Bieruń, Silesian Voivodeship, 310 km south-west of the capital, Warsaw. Piast represents one of the largest coal reserve in Poland having estimated reserves of 150 million tonnes of coal. The annual coal production is around 5 million tonnes.

References

External links 
 Official site

Coal mines in Poland
Bieruń-Lędziny County
Coal mines in Silesian Voivodeship